Robert Baker (born October 15, 1979, in Memphis, Tennessee) is an American actor known for his roles in Valentine, Grey's Anatomy, Out of Time, and a supporting role in the film Special.

Early life
Baker is the son of musician Lee Baker and his wife Carol. His father Lee was a member of the Memphis rock group, Mud Boy and the Neutrons.

Career
He had a small role as a partygoer in the 1999 film Angel on Abbey Street. While still attending theater school at the University of Southern California, he landed a role in the TV movie The Ruling Class, playing a funny high school jock.

In 2018, Baker recurred in Supergirl as Mercy Graves' brother Otis Graves.

Filmography

Film

Television

Video game

References

External links 

Robert Baker Interview With Influx Magazine

Living people
1979 births
American male film actors
American male television actors
21st-century American male actors